Vlad Ivanov (born Vladimir Ivanov , 4 August 1969) is a Romanian actor of Lipovan origin. He is represented by Subtitle Talent Agency.

Selected filmography

 Barbie- Princess and the Pauper- King Dominik (Romanian voice)

Awards  
 The Los Angeles Film Critics Association Award for Best Supporting Actor (2007)
 The Gopo Award for Best Supporting Actor for the role of Mr. Bebe in 4 Months, 3 Weeks and 2 Days (2008)
 The Gopo Award for Best Supporting Actor for the role of Anghelache in Police, Adjective (2010)

References

External links 
 Subtitle Talent

 
 Interviu Vlad Ivanov on PORT.ro

Romanian male film actors
People from Botoșani
Romanian people of Russian descent
Living people
1969 births
21st-century Romanian male actors